Honey Creek is a stream in Clark County in  the U.S. state of Missouri. It is a tributary of the Fox River.

Honey Creek was named for the honeybees along its course.

See also
List of rivers of Missouri

References

Rivers of Clark County, Missouri
Rivers of Missouri